Gwaebul (괘불), meaning "Large Buddhist Banner Painting," are extremely large-scale Buddhist scroll paintings found throughout Korea. They are fairly rare, and only 53 were studied between 1986 and 2001. The paintings are typically brought out only rarely for special festivals or holidays such as Buddha's Birthday or Gwaebul Festivals when they are unrolled and hung from tall poles in the temple courtyard. When not in use, gwaebul are stored in a box behind the altar in a temple hall.

They compare with the thongdrels of Bhutanese and Tibetan art. These are made from applique silk, and in Tibetan monasteries thangka walls are constructed specially for their display.

Status as Cultural Assets 
Of the known gwaebul, seven have been designated as National Treasures, 47 as Treasures, and eight as Registered Cultural Heritage objects.

See also 
 Thangka

References

Buddhist art
Korean painting